Holy Trinity Church is an Episcopalian church building in Dunoon, Argyll and Bute, Scotland. It is located on Kilbride Road, southwest of the town centre. Constructed in the Gothic revival style, it is a Category B listed building.

The church was built in 1850 by John Henderson. It was extended to the west in 1896 by Alexander Ross. Its bell was cast by John Warner & Sons.

Its current rector is Revd. David Railton.

History
Starting in 1846, Revd. Henry George Pirie held services in a hall in the town centre, for local Scottish Episcopalians. Funds were then raised towards their own church building. Records of donations included £5 from William Gladstone who was later a British Prime Minister.

Once a site had been granted near the ancient Celtic St Bride well, a church design was commissioned. Edinburgh architect John Henderson was involved. The first stone was laid on 31 March 1849. The following September the Right Revd. Alexander Ewing, the new Bishop of Argyll, visited the church and opened it for worship. A pipe organ was purchased in 1882.

By the 1890s there was insufficient space for the summer congregations. Architect Alexander Ross, of Inverness, was involved in 1894. The nave was increased in size to the west. In the years that followed, further additions included a large western porch (narthex) and a tower and bells. The sanctuary was remodelled some time around 1950.

Electric lighting was fitted for Christmas 1944, with contributions from the naval personnel stationed nearby in Innellan. An electric organ replaced the pipe organ in the late 20th century. 

In 2013, a significant conservation project was embarked upon, largely funded by Historic Scotland and the Heritage Lottery.

Rectors
Holy Trinity Church has had twenty rectors in its history.

Graveyard
There are monuments to Alexander Reid, a notable figure in the history of Scottish art, and Sir Francis Powell, the Scottish watercolourist.

Gallery

See also

List of listed buildings in Dunoon

References

External links
 Official website

Category B listed buildings in Argyll and Bute
Listed churches in Scotland
Listed buildings in Dunoon
Churches in Dunoon
1850 establishments in Scotland